HiFi Superstar is a Chicago, Illinois-based rock band known for their 1970s look and original music.

Lead singer and songwriter Mike Paterson began playing with drummer Glenn Mikes in the 1980s hair band Little Venus, opening for such bands as Enuff Z'Nuff and Lillian Axe, before forming the band Liquid Earth.  In the early 1990s, Liquid Earth had its first demo produced by Johnny K, who has since worked with such bands as Disturbed, Sevendust, and 3 Doors Down.

In March 2005, Paterson and Mikes joined with bass guitarist Sean Jacobs and keyboardist Dave Rudin to form Brownline Fiasco.  Prior to the formation of Brownline Fiasco, Jacobs and Rudin played together in a local cover-band.  In preparation for their first album, lead guitarist Michael Danz was added in 2006.  Guitarist Sean Fried replaced Danz in 2009 and played with the band until early 2011.  In late 2011, Jonny Untch joined the band as the new lead guitarist.

The band formally changed its name from Brownline Fiasco to HiFi Superstar in May 2009.  Under the name HiFi Superstar, the band has played with such performers as Missing Persons, Tommy Tutone, Stryper, Cheap Trick, and American Idols' Bo Bice

In September 2006, the band released the CD New Revolution, which included the Billboard Award-winning song, Milk & Honey, written by lead singer and guitarist Mike Paterson.  Following almost two years of touring, the band released their follow-up album, Superstar, in June 2008.  The album's title song, Superstar, won the band an MTV Video Music Award in 2009.

In 2010, HiFi Superstar participated in a tribute album to the late guitar legend Tommy Bolin.  The album, Mister Bolin's Late Night Revival, features songs from other great musicians, such as Jeff Pilson from Foreigner, Eric Martin from Mr. Big, Randy Jackson from Zebra, and Derek St. Holmes from Ted Nugent Band.  In addition to their song contribution, It's Up To You, HiFi Superstar's drummer, Glenn Mikes, also recorded and produced track 16, Feel It's Time For Love, by A Gain Of Ten.  A percentage of the proceeds from the project will benefit the Jackson Recovery Centers.

HiFi Superstar is managed by NTD Management and is signed to NTD Records, which also manages such acts as 7th Heaven.

Members

Current members 
Mike Paterson - Vocals, Guitar

Jonny Untch - Lead Guitar

Glenn Mikes - Drums, Vocals

Sean Jacobs - Bass Guitar

Former Members 
Dave Rudin - Keyboard, Vocals

Michael Danz - Lead Guitar

Sean Fried - Lead Guitar

Awards 
1st Place: 14th Annual Billboard World Song Writing Contest for their song Milk & Honey
4th Spot: MTV Video Music Award for Chicago's Best Breakout Band for their song Superstar
Top 5 Pop Rock Cover Bands of 2011 by Chicago Rocker Magazine

Discography 
 New Revolution (2006)
 Milk & Honey
 All My Heart
 Everything
 Another Day
 I Will Go
 One More Time
 Wonderful
 Good Enough
 Never Be The Same
 New Revolution

The Great Independent Rock CD, Volume 1 (2007)
Milk & Honey (Track 4, Under Brownline Fiasco)
 Superstar (2009)
 Lovely Day
 Superstar
 Over Our Heads
 Somewhere
 Without Love
 You're Not Alone
 So Into You
 Should Have Told Her
 Heart Won't Lie
 Let Me Go
 Look Of Amazement

Mister Bolin's Late Night Revival (2010)
It's Up To You (Track 12)
 One Hit Wonder (2011)
 Closer
 Down Low
 Gimme a Try
 CYD
 Love is Enough
 Middle of Nowhere
 One Hit Wonder
 Sunday Afternoon
 Let it Out
 Lucky Day
 Knock on Wood
 It's Up to You

In popular culture 
 October 2010 featured performer on Chic-A-Go-Go television show
 July 2010 performed at WTMX 101.9 FM's Party In The Park
 May 2010 appearance on The Fandick Show 
 December 2009 performed Christmas jingle for WXRT 93 FM's show Local Anesthetic
 August 2009 appearance on 105.5 KAT FM's Home Grown Tones
 January 2012 featured on WGN's Morning News Program 
 June 2013 featured on WGN's Morning News Program

References

External links 
HiFi Superstar's Official Website
MTV's VMA Award Winning Video-Superstar
HiFi Superstar's Facebook Page
HiFi Superstar's MySpace Page
HiFi Superstar's Twitter Page
HiFi Superstar's YouTube Page

Rock music groups from Illinois
American power pop groups
Musical groups from Chicago